Khwaja Kamal-ud-Din (1870 – December 28, 1932) was a prominent figure of the early Ahmadiyya movement and the author of numerous works about Islam.

Life 
Khwaja Kamal-ud-Din was born in Punjab, India in 1870. His grandfather, Abdur Rashid, a poet, was at one time chief Muslim Judge of Lahore during the Sikh period. Kamal-ud-Din was educated at the Forman Christian College, Lahore where he was drawn to Christianity, but he was later exposed to the writings of Mirza Ghulam Ahmad, the founder of the Ahmadiyya movement, and experienced a renewed devotion to Islam. In 1893, he joined the movement and became a close disciple of Ghulam Ahmad,

Kamal-ud-Din worked as a lecturer and then as principal of Islamia College, Lahore. After graduating in law in 1898, he started a legal practice in Peshawar. In 1912 he travelled to England on behalf of a client and was instructed by Hakeem Noor-ud-Din, the first  caliph (successor) to Ghulam Ahmad, to try to get the disused  Shah Jahan Mosque re-opened. In London, Kamal-ud-Din met with other Muslims and worked to repair and re-open the mosque. Here he founded the Woking Muslim Mission and Literary Trust and a journal, The Islamic Review.

Kamal-ud-Din ended his legal career in 1912, and devoted his life to the propagation of non-denominational Islam in Britain. He made several long visits to England and toured other countries in Europe, Africa, and Asia, including his home country of India, delivering lectures on Islam. In 1923, he performed his second Hajj in the company of close friend Lord Headley, a British convert. The same year, he was also elected member of the League of Nations Union. Following the split in the Ahmadiyya movement in 1914, Kamal-ud-Din aligned himself with the Lahore Ahmadiyya Movement under Muhammad Ali. In 1920, Kamal-ud-Din toured Southeast Asia where, through public discourses, won the confidence of some Indonesian Muslims. He delivered a number of speeches in Surabaya and Batavia which attracted headlines in several leading newspapers.

Literary work 
Below is a partial list of English books by Khwaja Kamal-ud-Din, which can be read online:
(Urdu books by Khwaja Kamal-ud-Din are also accessible online.)

 Al-Islam
 Ethics of War
 The Existence of God
 Five Pillars of Islam
 God and His Attributes
 The Great Revolution
 The Holy Quran and the Bible
 Introduction to the Study of the Holy Quran
 Islam and Christianity
 Islam and Civilisation
 Islam & Other Religions
 Islam to East and West
 Jesus — An Ideal of Godhead and Humanity
 Muhammad the Most Successful Prophet
 Mysticism in Islam
 The Problem of Human Evolution
 The Quran a Miracle
 A Running Commentary on the Holy Quran
 The Sources of Christianity
 The Status of Women in World Religions and Civilisations
 The Strength of Islam
 Study for an Atheist
 Study of Islam
 Sufeism in Islam
 Unity of the Human Race
 The Vicegerent of God on Earth
 Woman from Judaism to Islam
 Worship and Sacrificialism

References

External links 

 
 An Interview with Khwaja Kamal-ud-Din Sahib - His Missionary Work in England, Special to the "Rangoon Mail", Islamic Review, October, 1920 (Vol. 8, No. 10) pp. 362–366

Lahore Ahmadiyya Movement for the Propagation of Islam
20th-century Muslim scholars of Islam
Indian Ahmadis
1870 births
1932 deaths